Samba was a son of the Hindu god Krishna and his second consort, Jambavati. His foolish prank brought an end to the Yadu dynasty.

Early worship
In the 1st century BC, there seems to be evidence for a worship of five Vrishni heroes (Balarama, Krishna, Pradyumna, Aniruddha and, Samba), due to the Mora Well Inscription found at Mora near Mathura, which apparently mentions a son of the great satrap Rajuvula, probably the satrap Sodasa and an image of Vrishni, "probably Vasudeva, and of the "Five Warriors". The Brahmi inscription can be seen on the Mora stone slab, now in the Mathura Museum.

Birth

The Mahabharata and the Devi Bhagavata Purana narrate the story of the birth of Samba. Jambavati was unhappy when she realized that only she had not given birth to a child while all other wives were blessed with many children. She approached Krishna to find a solution and to be blessed with a son like the handsome Pradyumna, Krishna's first-born son. Krishna knew this son would herald in the destruction of the Yadu clan, and therefore needed to be a form of Shiva's destructive energy. Then Krishna went to the hermitage of the sage Upamanyu in the Himalayas and as advised by the sage, he started to pray to the god Shiva. He performed his penance for six months in various postures; once holding a skull and a rod, then standing on one leg only in the next month and surviving on water only, during the third month he did penance standing on his toes and living on air only. Pleased with the austerities, Shiva finally appeared before Krishna as Samba, (Ardhanarishvara) the half-female, half-male form of the god Shiva-Shakti, asked him to ask a boon. Krishna then sought a son from Jambavati, which was granted. A son was born soon thereafter who was named Samba, the form Shiva had appeared before Krishna.
                       
According to Bhagavata Purana, Jambavati was the mother of Samba, Sumitra, Purujit, Shatajit, Sahasrajit, Vijaya, Chitraketu, Vasuman, Dravida and Kratu. The Vishnu Purana says that she has many sons headed by Samba.

Marriage
Samba grew up to be a nuisance to the Yadavas, Krishna's clan. Lakshmanaa, who was the daughter of Duryodhana and younger sister of Lakshmana Kumara had come of age. Her father arranged her swayamvara and many princes came to win her hand. Samba had heard of Lakshmana and wanted to marry her. He went to her swayamvara and abducted her. He defeated the Kuru maharathis who pursued him, but was finally caught. He was arrested by the Kuru elders and thrown in prison. 

Lakshmana's swayamvara was re-arranged, but no other prince was willing to marry her, since it was considered that a woman abducted by another man belonged to that man. The princes were actually afraid of the Yadavas who might attack them on Samba's behalf. Balarama, who was fond of his notorious nephew, went to Hastinapura to bail him out. The Kurus refused. Balarama became enraged and started smashing up the palace. Soon after, Duryodhana apologised for their conduct. Balarama was pacified and ordered the Kurus to free Samba. Duryodhana then affectionately married his daughter off to Samba and the marriage was celebrated in pomp and show. Samba and Lakshmanaa had ten children.

Curse of Leprosy
The Bhavishya Purana, the Skanda Purana and the Varaha Purana narrate that some of Krishna's junior wives were infatuated with Samba. One wife, Nandini, disguised herself as Samba's wife and slept with him. Krishna heard of this blasphemous act from the sage Narada and cursed Samba to be inflicted with leprosy and his wives to be kidnapped by robbers after his own death.

In another version of the tale, Samba used his appearance to fool his stepmothers and play pranks with them in the absence of his father. Krishna bore it with patience as he did not like to hurt him. One day, Samba teased the sage Narada for his looks. The sage felt humiliated and was infuriated. He decided to teach Samba a lesson. He lured Samba to the private bathing pool where his stepmothers were taking bath. Finding intrusion on their privacy, they all complained to Krishna. Krishna was mortified to learn that his son had been peeping and cursed him to suffer from leprosy. Samba pleaded his innocence and expressed that he was misled by Narada. Krishna found it to be true and repented for his action in haste. As the curse cannot be revoked, he advised Samba to pray Surya who alone can cure him of the deadly disease.

The Samba Purana consists of the narrative of Samba getting infected by leprosy, after being cursed by sage Durvasa for mocking him. Later, he got cured by worshipping Surya in the temple constructed by him in Mitravana on the banks of the Chandrabhaga, which was once Multan Sun Temple. Samba underwent penance for 12 years in Mitravana near the shores of Chandrabhaga.  Both the original Konark Sun Temple and the Multan Sun Temple at Multan, earlier known as Kashyapapura, have been attributed to Samba. He was cured by the Sun God Surya after 12 years of penance near Konark. As a tradition in the state of Odisha, India this day is celebrated as Samba Dashami on the 10th day of the Shukla Paksha of Pausha Masa. On this day, mothers pray to Surya for the health of their children.

Destruction of the Yadava clan

At the end of Kurukshetra war, all 100 of Gandhari's sons, the Kauravas were killed by their cousins, the Pandavas, who were aided by Krishna. Pandavas also lost all of their sons. Gandhari cursed Krishna for allowing all this destruction to happen. She cursed that he, his city and all his subjects would be destroyed. Krishna accepted the curse.

The book Mausala Parva describes the fulfillment of the curse 36 years after the end of the great war. With Yudhisthira's realm now peaceful and prosperous, the youth of the Yadava clan have become frivolous and hedonistic. Samba dresses up as a woman and his friends meet Rishi Vishwamitra, Durvasa, Vashista, Narada and other rishis, who were visiting Dwaraka for an audience with Krishna. The young man playfully pretending to be a woman claims that he is pregnant, and asks the rishis to predict the gender of the baby. One rishi sees through the prank. In a fit of rage, he curses that Samba will give birth to an iron bolt (Gada (mace) a weapon) that will destroy his entire race. As per the curse, the next day, Samba gave birth to an iron rod. The youth informed King Ugrasena of what has happened. Ugrasena ordered  Samba to crush the rod into powder and cast it into the Prabhas sea. The powder washed up onto the sea shore and grew into long reeds of eraká grass. Later on in the story, the Yadavas are at that same seashore for a festival, when a fight breaks out between them all. Not having any weapons to hand, the Yadavas break off the eraká grass, which they discovered was as strong as iron, and use this to kill each other. Thus, the iron bolt destroys the entire Yadava Clan. 

One larger piece of the bolt was swallowed by a fish. That same fish was caught by a hunter named Jara, who in his past life was Vali in the Ramayana. He removed the iron piece from his catch and noticing that it had a point and arrow head like shape, sharpened it as such and stuck it onto the tip of one of his arrows. The hunter Jara mistook Krishna's partly visible left foot for a deer and shot the arrow. The arrow mortally wounded Krishna resulting in his departure from the earth.

See also

Multan Sun Temple
Samba district
Samba Purana
Mausala Parva

References

Bibliography 

 

 People related to Krishna
 Characters in the Mahabharata